Crispa 400 was the name of two amateur basketball teams owned by P. Floro and Sons, Inc. that played in the Manila Industrial and Commercial Athletic Association (MICAA) from 1977 to 1981 and the Philippine Basketball League (PBL) from 1989 to 1992, respectively. The name Crispa 400 refers to a line of T-shirts manufactured by the Floro company.

The first team maintained Crispa's presence in amateur basketball following the transfer of the original Crispa franchise to the Philippine Basketball Association in 1975. It disbanded with the demise of the MICAA in 1982. 

In 1986, Crispa returned to the commercial basketball scene by joining the National Seniors tournament early that year. The players that made up the new Crispa team included Glenn Capacio, Eric Altamirano and Jack Tanuan, who would all become members of the national team for the 1986 Asian Games, and among others; Ato Agustin, Jeffrey Graves and Adriano Polistico. The team was coached by Arturo Valenzona. In October 1986, Crispa would merge with the Lhuillier Jewelers ballclub that won the PABL First Conference championship and the team became known as Crispa-Lhuillier.   

Crispa joined the PABL in 1989, winning two titles, and disbanded in 1992. Two years later, a Chinese selection playing as a guest team in the PBL was sponsored by Crispa.

Crispa's basketball prime mover, Valeriano "Danny" Floro, died on February 24, 1995.

MICAA (1977-1981)
Team names: Crispa Swingers / Crispa 400 / Walk Tall Jeans / Crispa 400 Redmanizers
Coach: Narciso Bernardo

Notable players

Uldarico Acuña
Pedro Alfaro
Jose Arguelles
Antonio Azurin
Edgardo Baldomero
Conrado Banal
Noli Banate
Henry Brodett
Rolando Cariño
Jose Bernardo "Joy" Carpio
Edgardo Cordero
Juanito dela Cruz
Victor Dalupan
Rudy Distrito
Angelito Esguerra
Reynaldo Gomez
Dante Gonzalgo
Edgar Guidaben
Filomeno Gulfin
Leo Isaac
Federico "Padim" Israel
Jimmy Javier
Renato Kabigting
Eugene Leaño
Ludolfo Ludovice
Roberto Manalaysay
Francisco Maristela
Kenneth McMurray
Abito Orcullo
 Abelardo Ortiz
Wilfredo Paez
Jose Salas
Alfredo Serafica
Gregorio Rastrullo
Steve Watson
Edmund Yee

PBL (1989-1992)
Team names: Crispa Redmanizers / Crispa 400 / Crispa White Cement
Coaches: Arturo Valenzona (1989), Fortunato Co, Jr (1990), Bogs Adornado (1991-1992).
Team Manager: Antonio Uichico

Rosters (years played)

Alejo Alolor (1989) (played one conference before returning to the PBA)  
Daniel Arango (1989) 
Pat Codiñera (1989-1990) 
Rolando Cruz (1989-1990)   
Bernie Fabiosa (1989) (played two conferences before returning to the PBA)   
Saturnino Garrido (1989-1991)
Napoleon Hatton (1989)   
Roberto Jabar (1989-1992)  
Oscar Latoreno (1989)     
Sixto Mondarte (1989-1990)
Victor Pablo (1989-1991)   
Joseph Pelaez (1989)  
Aldo Perez (1989)     
Johnny Abarrientos (1989-1992) (started playing in the 3rd conference of 1989 season)
Gene Afable (1989-1990) (started playing in the 3rd conference of 1989 season)
Olsen Racela (1989-1990) (started playing in the 3rd conference of 1989 season)
Ramil Basa (1990)
Maximo Delantes (1990-1991)
Felix Duhig (1990-1992)
Rene Hawkins (1990)
Allen Sasan (1990)
Julian Tomacruz (1990) 
Jose Villarama (1990)
Victor Villarias (1990-1991)
Rudy Enterina (1990)
Kevin Ramas (1990-1992) (started playing in the 3rd conference of 1990 season)
Albert David (1991-1992)
Nestor Echano (1991-1992)
Estelito Epondulan (1991-1992)
Edward Joseph Feihl (1991)
Alejandro Lim (1991)
Gil Lumberio (1991)
Romulo Orillosa (1991-1992)
Giovanni Pineda (1992)
Eric Quiday (1991-1992)

References

External links
Google News Archive@Manila Standard
1986 Crispa team photo

Manila Industrial and Commercial Athletic Association teams
Former Philippine Basketball League teams
Defunct basketball teams in the Philippines
Basketball teams established in 1977
Basketball teams disestablished in 1992
Crispa Redmanizers
1977 establishments in the Philippines
1992 disestablishments in the Philippines